Wierzchowiska Górne  is a village in the administrative district of Gmina Bełżyce, within Lublin County, Lublin Voivodeship, in eastern Poland.

References

Villages in Lublin County